The 2014–15 Moldovan Women Top League season in association football is the 15th since its establishment. A total of 7 teams contested the league.

The season began on 7 September 2014 and ended on 25 May 2015. Goliador Chişinău were the defending champions.

Teams

Format
Team play each other three times for a total of 18 matches each.

League table

References

External links
Women Top League - Moldova - Results, fixtures, tables and news - FMF
League at uefa.com

Moldovan Women Top League seasons
Moldovan Women Top League 2014-15
2014–15 domestic women's association football leagues